New Rochelle High School (NRHS) is a public high school in New Rochelle, New York. It is part of the City School District of New Rochelle and is the city's sole public high school.

Its student body represents 60 countries from around the world. It is a two-time Blue Ribbon School and is accredited by the Middle States Association Commission on Secondary Schools.

96% of graduates attend college or other institutions of higher learning and students earn accolades in competitive national programs including the National Merit Scholarship and the Regeneron Science Talent Search.

Campus
The school buildings are situated at the rear of a plot of land, fronted by two lakes, and 'Huguenot Park'. The forty-three acres of land that comprise the park, including what is now "Twin Lakes", were acquired by the City in 1923 as the site for the community's new high school and a park. At the time, the twin lakes were one large lake which had been used for an ice manufacturing business by the Mahlstedt family. At the southeast corner of the property is the Mahlstedt house where three generations of the family lived while operating their ice business at the lake. After the City purchased the land, the Mahlstedt house became the Huguenot Park Branch of the New Rochelle Public Library in 1926. Due to inadequate facilities and budget cuts,  in 1992 the Huguenot Branch closed, and in 1996 the Huguenot Children's Library opened on the site.

A white marble World War II Marines Memorial is located near the causeway leading to the High School from North Avenue. The monument was dedicated on June 3, 1949, to the 15 New Rochelle Marines who died while fighting in the war.

The high school is designed in the French-Gothic style by the noted architectural firm of Guilbert and Betelle. It includes a working clock tower, indoor swimming facilities, eight tennis courts, two football fields, one combined soccer and baseball field, an outdoor track, a television station and a planetarium. The planetarium can hold 84 viewers and uses a 'Spitz Scidome', 360 degree fulldome video projector with ATM-4 automation and a 5.1 surround sound audio system.

On May 17, 1968, school buildings dating from the 1920s and 1930s were destroyed by arson. A 16-year-old high school student with a history of setting fires to attract attention was arrested for the arson. Additions made to school buildings in 1959 and 1960 were not affected. Fire insurance allowed the school to rebuild while displaced students were accommodated at local junior high schools under a time-sharing arrangement.

On August 15, 2008, New Rochelle High School was struck by lightning. The resulting fire badly damaged the building's distinctive spire. The fire occurred just two months after the 40th anniversary of the 1968 arson fire that destroyed much of the school.

The spring 2018 school semester at New Rochelle High School was marred by several instances of violence involving students.

In 2019, it was reported that NRHS administrator Shadia Alvarez was being fired "for changing 212 grades for 32 students by making 'entries and changes to students' records in violation of NRHS grade-change practice and without any consistent, comprehensible or valid explanation.'"

Academics
To create a more personalized atmosphere, NRHS is organized into eight smaller learning communities of approximately 400-600 students each. The communities are geographically defined and serve as a home base for students and teachers. Ninth and tenth grade students in each community are teamed with core area teachers in English, social studies, mathematics, and science. These teacher-student 'teams' remain intact for ninth and tenth grade in order to provide continuity for students and staff.  Eleventh and twelfth grade students remain within their communities even though most course work occurs throughout the campus.

Departments
 Arts Department, an expansive program integrating Art, Music, Dance and Theater Arts within the school. The four main standards are stressed by the department: Creating, Performing, and Participating in The Arts; Knowing and Using Arts Materials and Resources; Responding To and Analyzing Works of Art; Understanding The Cultural Dimensions and Contributions of The Arts.  The department also provides a Performing and Visual Arts Education (P.A.V.E.) program enabling students to major in the Arts. Each year competitive auditions are held for each artistic discipline; Visual Arts, Theater, Vocal Music, Orchestra, Band and Dance . Once in the program, students attend classes before school so that there are no conflicts with their regular academic course load.
 Business Education Department, geared towards preparing students for career and workplace success. Current programs of study include:  Business; Marketing & Entrepreneurship; Marketing and Computer Applications.
 Engineering and Architectural Design Department, offers courses in architectural design, architectural presentation, CADD aided residential drawing and design and drawing for production. Students can select the Architectural design sequence of courses as their major. The department features teachers with professional backgrounds in science, technology and mathematics.
 Foreign Language Department, features a complement of educators from Europe; Italian, Spanish, French, Greek, and Latin courses; future progressive program advantages for students in Dual Language Programs founded in elementary and middle schools; opportunities for students from more than 50 countries of the world. In 2009, Mandarin was added to this list of foreign languages.
 Sciences and Mathematics Department, offers students the opportunity to participate in the community of scientific research and scholarship as part of their high school experience.  In addition to class, formal individual meetings are held once a week. Students select a topic of interest and explore this topic through library research, person to person conversations with research scientists throughout the country, and telecommunication to research and college libraries. Students develop sophisticated data collecting and lab skills by completing a literature search, formulating a research question, articulating hypotheses, collecting and analyzing data, and presenting their findings to a bona fide scientific audience (e.g., The Intel Talent Search, the New York State Science Symposium, and local and regional science fairs).

Honor societies
 NRHS Chapter of National Honor Society, part of a national organization.  Membership is based on scholarship, community service, leadership, and character.  To qualify, students must possess a minimum cumulative unweighted average of 87.0, show a minimum of 20 verifiable hours of community service, and display strong leadership qualities.  Students meeting these requirements are interviewed and selected by members of the Faculty Council.
 Spanish Honor Society, open to juniors and seniors who have shown outstanding work in Spanish for a minimum of 2 years. Final acceptance is subject to review by the NRHS Foreign Language Department in accordance with the guidelines of the Sociedad Honoraria Hispanica.
 French Honor Society, open to juniors and seniors who have consistently maintained a high average in French for a minimum of 3 years.
 Latin Honor Society, open to juniors and seniors who have consistently achieved 90s in Latin for a minimum of 3 years.
 Italian Honor Society, open to juniors and seniors who have consistently maintained a high average in their years spent studying the language.
 Tri-M Music Honor Society, open to students of the Instrumental and Vocal Music Departments upon recommendation by their respective teacher.
 National Art Honor Society, members must meet select national standards in art and display a strong focus on community service.
 Math Honor Society, open to those who maintain a high average in math throughout high school
 National English Honor Society, was founded in 2008 for those who maintain a high English average throughout high school.

The Fund for Educational Excellence
The Fund for Educational Excellence is a private foundation formed to address the dramatic increase in the cost of public education by supporting aspects of the public educational system that fall outside the normal operating budget. The Fund was established in 1998 in a cooperative effort by the Superintendent of Schools, members of the Board of Education and community leaders to preserve the New Rochelle tradition of excellence in education. Most notably, the Fund has sponsored several benefit concerts featuring NRHS students at major performance venues including Carnegie Hall and Avery Fisher Hall of Lincoln Center.

The Museum of Arts and Culture 
The Museum of Arts and Culture is an on-site museum offering exhibits and programs focused on the fine arts, history, literature and science and technology. The museum opened in 2006 and is the only Regents-chartered museum in a school in the state of New York.

Co and extra-curricular activities
The school has a considerable number of clubs including:

Accomplishments
 The school's Academic Team is 3rd in the nation after the 2008 National Academic Championship.
 The school's Model Congress Club is the oldest and longest running high school level model congress in the country. Model Congress originated at New Rochelle High School in 1964 when faculty advisor William P. Clarke sought an extracurricular outlet for bright students not engaged in sports. Richard Nixon was the guest speaker at the club's first mock presidential convention in 1964. The club is focused around debating issues through the use of bills and parliamentary procedure.  The club becomes a delegation when it debates in foreign congresses, both college congresses and those associated with the United Model Congresses. Each year the school holds a Model Congress weekend, hosting "foreign delegations" from other schools.
 NRHS was the 2007 Lower Hudson Valley Regional Science Olympiad champion.
 NRHS students have been repeatedly recognized as semi-finalists and finalists in the highly competitive Intel Science Talent Search.

Interscholastic sports

Fall schedule
 Varsity and Junior Varsity Cheerleading
 Boys & Girls Cross Country
 Freshman Football
 Junior Varsity Football
 Varsity Football
 Boys Junior Varsity Soccer
 Boys Varsity Soccer
 Girls Junior Varsity Soccer
 Girls Varsity Soccer
 Girls Swimming
 Girls Junior Varsity Volleyball
 Girls Varsity Volleyball
 Girls Varsity Tennis
 Girls Junior Varsity Tennis
 Co-Ed Ultimate Frisbee

Winter schedule
 Varsity and Junior Varsity Cheerleading
 Boys Freshman Basketball
 Boys Junior Varsity Basketball
 Girls Junior Varsity Basketball
 Girls Varsity Basketball
 Boys Varsity ice hockey
 Boys Varsity Soccer
 Boys Varsity Indoor Track
 Girls Varsity Indoor Track
 Girls Varsity Swimming
 Boys Varsity Swimming
 Boys Varsity Volleyball 
 Boys Varsity wrestling
 Boys Junior Varsity Wrestling

Spring schedule
 Boys Junior Varsity Baseball
 Boys Varsity Baseball
 Freshman Baseball()
 Varsity Golf
 Boys Junior Varsity Lacrosse
 Boys Varsity Lacrosse
 Girls Junior Varsity Lacrosse
 Girls Varsity Lacrosse
 Junior Varsity Rugby
 Varsity Rugby
 Girls Junior Varsity Softball
 Girls Varsity Softball
 Boys Junior Varsity Tennis
 Boys Varsity Tennis
 Boys Varsity Track
 Girls Varsity Track
 Co-Ed Ultimate Frisbee

Athletic accomplishments

 The varsity basketball team was a New York Section AA finalist in 2003 and 2013.
 The Varsity football team won the New York State title in 2003, 2012 and 2019 and was a New York State Class AA finalist in 2000, 2004 and 2009 and semi-finalist in 2007, 2008, 2010 and 2015. The team has earned the title of New York State Section 1 AA champion nine times since 2003 including five straight times from 2006 to 2010.
 The boys varsity tennis team won the 2005 New York State doubles title.  The team also were league champions in 2017 and 2018.
 David Stewart (swimming '15) currently holds a NYSPHSAA Section 1 record in the men's 100-yard butterfly as of 2015. 
 The varsity girls basketball team is the school's first to compete in the NYS Section 1 Class AA semi-finals, where they earned the first runner-up prize in their division.
 In 2005 NRHS student Lynne Lane set a Section 1 track record and was the 60-meter national champion.
 Throughout the years, the girls and boys track teams have won many league, county and sectional titles. In 2008 and 2010 the girls shuttle-hurdle team won national championships.
 Both the varsity and JV cheerleading teams were national champions at the 2013 Universal Cheerleading Association National HS Cheerleading Championships.
 In 2016, the boys varsity soccer team won its first Class AA New York State Championship since 1986.

Notable alumni

Notable alumni sorted by graduation year.

Theodore Pratt (1919): author
Elia Kazan (1926): Academy Award–winning director<ref name=CB>{{Cite book |title=Current Biography Yearbook |place=New York |publisher=H. W. Wilson Company |year=1971 |page=24}}</ref>
James Gregory (1930): stage, screen, and TV actor
James Steen (1931): football player for the Detroit Lions
Marion West Higgins (1932): first female Speaker of New Jersey General Assembly
Miriam Davenport (1933): painter and sculptor who played central role in helping Jews escape the Holocaust
Dan DeCarlo (1937): cartoonist, developed look of Archie Comics, created Josie and the Pussycats
Henry Heimlich (1937): inventor, Heimlich Maneuver
Betty Freeman (1939): photographer and philanthropist
Gloria Oden (1939): African American poet
Don Hewitt (1940): 60 Minutes producer
Tad Mosel (1940): Pulitzer Prize–winning playwright
Jerome Kohlberg, Jr. (1943): billionaire cofounder of private equity firms KKR and Kohlberg & Co.
Kay Christopher (1944): actress and model 
William Klemperer (1944): chemical physicist and molecular spectroscopist
Richard Kahn (1947): president, Academy of Motion Picture Arts and Sciences
Joseph Pisani (1947): lawyer and politician
Lou Jones (1950): Olympic gold medalist sprinter
Louis Rukeyser (1950): financial journalist
Jesse Arnelle (1950): football and basketball player at Penn State
Anthony Charles Beilenson (1950): Democratic Congressman
Henry C. Moses (1951): educator (Dean of Freshmen at Harvard; headmaster Trinity School)
Jacob Landau (1952): journalist, attorney, and free-speech activist (founding executive director of Reporters Committee for Freedom of the Press)
Leslie H. Gelb (1955): Council on Foreign Relations president
Harry Macklowe (1955): chairman and CEO, Macklowe Properties Real Estate Investment
William S. Rukeyser (1957): journalist
Ken Blanchard (1957): management expert, coauthor of The One Minute ManagerJohnny Counts (1958): New York Giants running back
Drew S. Days III (1959): Solicitor General of the United States, Professor of Law at Yale Law School
Lawrence M. Small (1959): 11th Secretary of Smithsonian Institution
Fred Rosen (1961):  attorney, business executive and philanthropist
Richard Roundtree (1961): actor, best known as film's John Shaft
Barrie M. Osborne (1962): film producer, 2004 Academy Award winner (The Lord of the Rings: The Return of the King)
Butch Harmon (1962): golf professional, former coach of Tiger Woods 
Andrea Mitchell (1963): journalist
Russell T. Lewis (1965): CEO of The New York Times Company
George Starke (1966): tackle, Washington Redskins
Harry Stein (1966): author and columnist
Alan Menken (1967): composer, lyricist
Jeralyn Merritt (1967): criminal defense attorney, legal analyst, blogger
Ralph Guggenheim (1969):  video graphics designer, 1995 "Producers Guild of America Award" winner (Toy Story) 
Guy Davis (1970): musician, son of actors Ossie Davis and Ruby Dee 
Gloria Borger (1970): political analyst for CNN
Christopher Edley, Jr. (1970): Dean of University of California, Berkeley School of Law
Michael Kaiser (1971): president of John F. Kennedy Center for the Performing Arts 	
Glynnis O'Connor (1973): actress
Al Seckel (1976): writer, specialist on illusions, creator of Darwin fish design
Stuart C. Lord (1978): educator
Rachel Vail (1984): children's author
Clifford J. Levy (1985): Pulitzer Prize–winning journalist
Noam Bramson (1987): mayor of New Rochelle
Craig Carton (1987): sports radio personality
Devon Hughes (1990): professional wrestler "Brother Devon", formerly known as "D-Von Dudley"
Ato Essandoh (1990): actor, known for Chicago Med''
Cristina Teuscher (1996): Olympic gold medalist swimmer
Jennifer Hyman (1998): entrepreneur
 Adam Rosen (2002): American-born British luger Olympian
Tom Koehler (2004): Former MLB pitcher, spent seasons with Miami Marlins and Toronto Blue Jays
Courtney Greene (2005): former Jacksonville Jaguars free safety
Ray Rice (2005): former Baltimore Ravens running back, three-time Pro Bowler, Super Bowl XLVII champion
Kyle Kulinski (2006): YouTuber and political commentator, co-founder of Justice Democrats
Jordan Lucas (2011): Defensive back for Chicago Bears, Super Bowl LIV champion
Josiah Gray (2015): Pitcher for the Washington Nationals

References

External links
 
 New Rochelle High School Fire of 1968 (relates the story of the fire and its consequences with both text and an extensive collection of historic photographs)
 NRHS Planetarium
 James Betelle - Where Are You?

Public high schools in Westchester County, New York
Education in New Rochelle, New York
School buildings in the United States destroyed by arson
Arson in New York (state)